Presidential elections were held in El Salvador on 13 January 1907. General Fernando Figueroa was elected with 99.76 percent of the vote.

Results

President

Vice president

References

El Salvador
President
Presidential elections in El Salvador